Megan Ferguson is an American actress. In 2011, Ferguson married fellow actor Nico Evers-Swindell.

Filmography

Film

Television

References

External links

Living people
American film actresses
American television actresses
Year of birth missing (living people)
21st-century American actresses